George Pearce (born 1864, date of death unknown) was a Jamaican cricketer. He played in one first-class match for the Jamaican cricket team in 1894/95.

See also
 List of Jamaican representative cricketers

References

External links
 

1864 births
Year of death missing
Jamaican cricketers
Jamaica cricketers
Cricketers from Kingston, Jamaica